Middlehurst is a surname. Notable people with the surname include:

Andy Middlehurst (born 1963), British racing driver
Barbara M. Middlehurst (1915–1995), Welsh astronomer
Gary Middlehurst (born 1983), English rugby league player
Tom Middlehurst (born 1936), Welsh politician